François Huguet was a 17h–18th-century French architect. He died around 1730.

François Huguet 

Son-in-law of François Houdault, in 1686, he took over the general layout of the Laval altarpieces of the Corbineau and Houdault families in Boistrudan. For Jacques Salbert, it is possible that the main altar of the  also belongs to his work.

Huguet completed the coronation of the towers of the Rennes Cathedral between 1679 and 1704, bringing them to their current height of 48 metres and added the motto of Louis XIV, (the incomparable) on the pediment at the top of the facade.

The construction of the new   took place throughout the 18th century. Huguet decided on an opposite orientation to the previous one. The first campaign of work from 1703 to 1718 began with the choir and the crossing of the transept.

References

Bibliography 
 Jules-Marie Richard, Les constructeurs de retables, 1906.
 Jacques Salbert, Ateliers de retabliers Lavallois aux XVIIe et XVIIIe siècles: Études historiques et artistiques, Presses Universitaires de Rennes, 1976.

Year of birth missing
Year of death missing
Place of birth missing
Place of death missing
17th-century French architects
18th-century French architects